Dongjing is a station on Shanghai Metro Line 9. It began operation on December 29, 2007.  It is located in Dongjing Town, in Songjiang District.

Railway stations in Shanghai
Line 9, Shanghai Metro
Railway stations in China opened in 2007
Shanghai Metro stations in Songjiang District